Phyllorhinichthys micractis is a species of dreamer that has been recorded from the Atlantic, Pacific and Indian Oceans.  The females of this species grow to a length of  SL.  The illicium is shorter than that of P. balushkini. The esca has two forward appendages at the tip and the rear appendage is much shorter and stouter than that of P. balushkini. The available specimens vary in the number and presence of additional appendages and filaments. The size of the snout flaps are also highly variable.

References
 

Oneirodidae
Taxa named by Theodore Wells Pietsch III
Fish described in 1969